The Mnet Asian Music Award for Best Music Video is an award presented annually by CJ E&M (Mnet) at the Mnet Asian Music Awards. The event was launched in 1999 as the Mnet Video Music Awards and was primarily a music video-centered awards ceremony, modeled after the MTV Video Music Awards. From its inaugural ceremony up until the 2005 awards, the category was officially titled Music Video of the Year and consisted of one of the two daesang (or most prestigious) prizes, alongside the Most Popular Music Video category. In 2006, the event underwent an overhaul; the daesang status of the category was removed, and it was retitled as "Best Music Video". Meanwhile, the Most Popular Music Video category was discontinued. 

In 1999, the inaugural Mnet Asian Music Award for Best Music Video was presented to Lee Seung-hwan for the video "A Request". In 2005, the video for "Isolated Ones! Left Foot Forward!" by Drunken Tiger was the final recipient of the Music Video of the Year daesang before its rebranding the following year. Since then, four artists have received the accolade more than once; among them, BTS holds the distinction for the most wins in the category, winning for five consecutive years between 2017 and 2021. Four artists have won the award twice: Big Bang, Psy, 2NE1, and Blackpink. BTS, in addition, has received the most nominations in the category with six.

Winners and nominees

Music Video of the Year (daesang)
From 1999–2005, the category was titled "Music Video of the Year" and was one of the ceremony's two daesang prizes. The event went through several name changes during this time period: "Mnet Video Music Awards" (1999), "Mnet Music Video Festival" (2000–2003), and "Mnet KM Music Video Festival" (2004–2005). No list of nominees was made available for the former daesang during the course of its existence.

Best Music Video
Starting in 2006, the former category's daesang status was dropped and it was instead retitled "Best Music Video". From 2006 to 2008, the event was renamed the "Mnet KM Music Festival" (MKMF). From 2009 onwards, it has been officially called the "Mnet Asian Music Awards" (MAMA).

Artists with multiple wins
5 wins
 BTS

2 wins
 Big Bang
 Psy
 2NE1
 Blackpink

Artists with multiple nominations

6 nominations
 BTS

4 nominations
 Dynamic Duo

3 nominations
 Big Bang
 Gain
 Psy
 Wonder Girls
 Blackpink

2 nominations
 2NE1
 Epik High
 Infinite
 Leessang
 Seo Taiji
 Shinee
 Taeyang
 Twice
 UV
 Wanna One

Notes

References

External links
 Mnet Asian Music Awards official website

MAMA Awards